Morychus is a genus of pill beetles in the family Byrrhidae. There are at least three described species in Morychus.

Species
These three species belong to the genus Morychus:
 Morychus aeneolus (LeConte, 1863) i c g b
 Morychus aeneus (Fabricius, 1775) g
 Morychus oblongus (LeConte, 1857) i c g b
Data sources: i = ITIS, c = Catalogue of Life, g = GBIF, b = Bugguide.net

References

Further reading

External links

 

Byrrhidae
Articles created by Qbugbot